Eta Ceti (η Cet, η Ceti) is a star in the equatorial constellation of Cetus. It has the traditional name Deneb Algenubi or Algenudi. The apparent visual magnitude of this star is +3.4, making it the fourth-brightest star in this otherwise relatively faint constellation.

This is a giant star that has been chosen a standard for the stellar classification of K2−IIIb. It has exhausted the hydrogen at its core and evolved away from the main sequence of stars like the Sun. (The classification is sometimes listed as K1.5 IIICN1Fe0.5, indicating a strong CN star with higher-than-normal abundance of cyanogen and iron relative to other stars of its class.) It is a red clump star that is generating energy through the nuclear fusion of helium at its core.

Eta Ceti may have slightly more mass than the Sun and its outer envelope has expanded to 15 times the Sun's radius. It is radiating 74 times as much luminosity as the Sun from its outer atmosphere at an effective temperature of 4,356 K. This heat gives the star the orange-hued glow of a K-type star.

In culture
The name Deneb Algenubi was from Arabic ذنب القيطس الجنوبي – al-dhanab al-qayṭas al-janūbī, meaning the southern tail of the sea monster. In the catalogue of stars in the Calendarium of Al Achsasi al Mouakket, this star was designated Aoul al Naamat (أول ألنعمة – awwil al naʽāmāt), which was translated into Latin as Prima Struthionum, meaning the first ostrich. This star, along with θ Cet (Thanih al Naamat), τ Cet (Thalath Al Naamat), ζ Cet (Baten Kaitos) and υ Cet, were Al Naʽāmāt (ألنعمة), the Hen Ostriches.

Planetary system
In 2014, two exoplanets around the star were discovered using the radial velocity method. Planets discovered by radial velocity have poorly known masses because if the orbit of the planets were inclined away from the line of sight, a much larger mass would have to compensate for the angle.

Assuming the orbits of the two are coplanar, then the two planets must be locked in a 2:1 orbital resonance, otherwise the system would become dynamically unstable. Although the inclinations from the line of sight are unknown, the value is constrained to be 70° or less: if any higher, the higher masses would render the system dynamically unstable, with no stable solutions.

References

K-type giants
CN stars
Cetus (constellation)
Ceti, Eta
BD–10 240
Ceti, 31
005364
0334
006805
Aoul al Naamat
J01083539-1010560